Magala  is a village in the southern state of Karnataka, India. It is located in the Hadagali taluk of Bellary district in Karnataka.

See also
 Bellary
 Districts of Karnataka

References

External links
 http://Bellary.nic.in/

Villages in Bellary district